Pontardawe Rugby Football club is a rugby union club based in Pontardawe, a small town in the valley of the River Tawe in  Wales.

The club has in the past had a successful junior section which provided age group rugby with fully qualified coaches from 7 through to 16, although at the moment, in line with the national trend of a decline in rugby participation, only have teams at Under 7, 13 and 14.

As players move on from junior/youth rugby many other clubs, included premiership teams, have had the benefit of the early development of these players by Pontardawe.

Over the years Pontardawe RFC has produced a number of first-class rugby players and coaches. In 2007 they celebrated their 125th year of being a Welsh Rugby Union member club.

In May 2006 Pontardawe RFC were one of the 13 'Rebel' clubs who brought a vote of no confidence against the Welsh Rugby Union, which centered on financing and the handling of former coach Mike Ruddock's departure. The vote failed heavily with only 20 votes for the motion and over 300 against.

As have many other clubs Pontardawe RFC have recently sold vintage rugby memorabilia to raise funds to improve facilities at the club.

A history of the club, written by J.R.Jones, was published in 1985.

Past notable players
 James Griffiths (1 cap)Welsh Youth (15 caps) Wales u 21's (5 caps) Wales "A" (4 caps)
 Phil Hopkins (4 caps)
 Percy Lloyd (4 caps)
 Joe Hawkins (1 cap)

External links 
 https://web.archive.org/web/20130507193509/http://pontardawerfc.co.uk/    Pontardawe RFC Official Web site https://web.archive.org/web/20130507193509/http://pontardawerfc.co.uk/

References 

Rugby clubs established in 1881
Pontardawe
Rugby union in Neath Port Talbot
1881 establishments in Wales